Findlay Small Douglas (17 November 1874 – 29 March 1959) was a Scottish amateur golfer who won the U.S. Amateur in 1898, and later became President of the United States Golf Association (USGA).

Life and career
Born in St Andrews, Scotland, Douglas learned to play golf as a boy.  He attended the University of St Andrews from 1892 to 1896, and played on the golf team. After graduation, he followed his oldest brother Robert and emigrated to the United States in 1897.

Douglas qualified for the U.S. Amateur in 1897, but lost in the semifinal.  In 1898 he won the event, defeating Walter B. Smith 5 & 3 in the final match.  He was the last Scot to win the tournament until 2006, when Richie Ramsay won.  Douglas made it to the final match in 1899 and again in 1900, but lost to H.M. Harriman and Walter Travis respectively.  In his only U.S. Open appearance in 1903, Douglas finished 8th, winning low amateur. He won the Metropolitan Amateur in 1901 and 1903.

Douglas joined several golf clubs in the New York area, and helped start others.  In 1908, he was one of the 70 founders of the National Golf Links of America.  Eventually, Douglas got involved in administrative roles, and served in various capacities at the Metropolitan Golf Association for 17 years, including president from 1922-24.

In 1926, Douglas became vice-president of the United States Golf Association, and then from 1929-30 served as president.  He presented Bobby Jones with the U.S. Open and U.S. Amateur trophies during Jones' Grand Slam in 1930.

Douglas later got involved with senior golf, winning the championship of the United States Senior's Golf Association (not affiliated with the USGA) in 1932, and later served as the organization's president from 1937-1941.  This was the forerunner to the USGA's U.S. Senior Amateur, which was started in 1955.

Douglas was the USGA's Bob Jones Award winner in 1959, given in recognition of distinguished sportsmanship in golf.  He died on Easter Sunday in 1959 with no surviving family, and his ashes were buried in a family plot in St Andrews.  In the late 1990s, the Royal and Ancient club restored the headstone, which had deteriorated, and added an inscription with Douglas' name, which had not been there.

Tournament wins (3)
1898 U.S. Amateur
1901 Metropolitan Amateur
1903 Metropolitan Amateur

Results in major championships

Amateur wins (1)

Results timeline
Note: Douglas played in only the U.S. Open, U.S. Amateur, and The Amateur Championship.

LA = Low amateur
NT = No tournament
DNP = Did not play
"T" indicates a tie for a place
DNQ = Did not qualify for match play portion
R256, R128, R64, R32, R16, QF, SF = Round in which player lost in match play
Green background for wins. Yellow background for top-10

Source for U.S. Open and U.S. Amateur: USGA Championship Database

Source for 1913 British Amateur: The American Golfer, July 1913, pg. 222.

Source for 1920 British Amateur: The Glasgow Herald, 8 June 1920, pg. 12.

References and notes

External links
U.S. Amateur 1898 page

Scottish male golfers
Amateur golfers
Golf administrators
Golfers from St Andrews
Alumni of the University of St Andrews
British emigrants to the United States
1874 births
1959 deaths